Fusicoccum amygdali is a plant pathogen, which often releases a toxin known as fusicoccin that causes the stomata of the plant to open.

References

External links 
 USDA ARS Fungal Database

Fungal plant pathogens and diseases
Botryosphaeriaceae
Fungi described in 1905